Thursford is a village and civil parish in the county of Norfolk, eastern England. The village is 16.3 miles southwest of Cromer, 24.5 miles northwest of Norwich and 121 miles north-east  of London. The village lies 6.9 miles northwest of the nearby town of Fakenham. The nearest railway station is at Sheringham for the Bittern Line which runs between Sheringham, Cromer and Norwich. The nearest airport is Norwich International Airport. The village once had its own Thursford railway station which is now closed. It is a proposed stop on the Norfolk Orbital Railway.

The villages name means 'Giant ford' or 'demon ford'.

Thursford parish church is dedicated to St Andrew and has some fine examples of Victorian stained glass windows. The church was rebuilt in the early 1860s with money given by the Chadd family who lived in the nearby Thursford Hall.

Thursford Collection

Thursford is the home of the Thursford Collection, which is an assortment of steam engines and fairground organs housed in a museum. The collection was founded by local man, the late George Cushing, and what began as a hobby turned into one of the world's most important steam and fairground museums. The collection includes a Mighty Wurlitzer theatre organ, which is the fourth-largest in Europe and has a total of 1,339 pipes. There is also a 19th-century gondola roundabout which was built in the Norfolk factory of Frederick Savage. The ride is decorated with carved heads depicting Queen Victoria and her family, including the German Kaiser Wilhelm II.

The collection and museum is also famous for its popular summer and winter musical shows. The annual Christmas "Spectaculars" attract coachloads of devotees from around the country and must be booked months in advance.

One of the organs in the collection, a Wellershaus, was seen and heard in the Dad's Army episode Everybody's Trucking, which originally aired on 15 November 1974.

Governance & religion
For local government purposes, Thursford civil parish falls under the North Norfolk District Council ward of Priory, whose present district councillor is Richard Kershaw of the Liberal Democrats, and the Norfolk County Council division of Melton Constable, whose present county councillor is Steffan Aquarone, also of the Liberal Democrats.  In the UK Parliament, it falls under the Broadland parliamentary constituency; before this it was for many years in the North Norfolk constituency until boundary changes in 2010. The MP since 2019 is Jerome Mayhew of the Conservative Party.

In the Church of England, the ecclesiastical parish of Thursford falls under the province of Canterbury, the diocese of Norwich, the archdeaconry of Lynn, and the deanery of Burnham and Walsingham.

References

External links

Villages in Norfolk
Civil parishes in Norfolk
North Norfolk